North American Midway Entertainment, LLC (NAME) is an American provider of midway services based in Farmland, Indiana that describes itself as "the world's largest traveling outdoor amusement park." NAME provides rides, games and food to over 15 million fairgoers every year in 20 states and 4 Canadian provinces. In 2018, NAME was recognized as the leading midway provider to the top 50 fairs in North America.

Currently, NAME provides midway services to over 130 events across the continent and also offers opportunities for special event amusement ride rentals.

The company represents a merger in 2004 of several midway companies, including part of Conklin Shows, the former Farrow Shows from Jackson, Mississippi, and Thebault-Blomsness (Astro Amusements and All Star Amusements). Later acquisitions were Mid America Shows and part of Cumberland Valley Shows.

North American Midway Entertainment was acquired by Townsquare Media of Greenwich, Connecticut in August 2015. On May 24, 2018, Townsquare Media sold North American Midway Entertainment to North American Fairs, LLC for $23.5 million.

NAME operates an award-winning employee recognition program called "The Magnificent Employee Program".

In 2019, NAME partnered with Netflix to launch the third season of Stranger Things at the Calgary Stampede. The company transformed the Giant Wheel with a massive banner and decals featuring characters and monsters which was just 1 of 5 attractions that were altered to be a little bit “Stranger” for the duration of the Stampede. Other attractions included Spider Ride, Mardi Gras, the Euroslide and the Balloon Pop Game. However, it wasn’t just the rides that were transformed - fairgoers were also able to purchase drinks and popcorn that featured the “Hawkins Fun Fair” branding which were sold to them by Hawkins Fun Fair Staff.

Also in 2019, NAME purchased a 150 foot tall (46 meters) traveling Ferris Wheel and premiered it at the South Carolina State Fair. The wheel is manufactured in Europe by Ronald Bussink of Professional Rides AG and travels on 20 tractor trailer loads. This particular Ferris Wheel features 36 gondolas that seat 4 to 6 guest per gondola.

Clients
 Canadian National Exhibition
Big E
 City Museum
 Calgary Stampede
Tulsa State Fair
Indiana State Fair
 K-Days
Kentucky State Fair
Mississippi State Fair
Miami-Dade County Fair
Red River Exhibition
South Carolina State Fair
Illinois State Fair
Regina Queen City Ex

References

Entertainment companies established in 2004
Amusement park companies
Traveling carnivals